Gary Taxali is a Canadian artist known for his cartoon-style illustrations.

Biography

Gary Taxali was born in Chandigarh, India and raised in Toronto, Ontario, Canada. His family persuaded him to pursue art at a young age. In 1991, Taxali graduated from the Ontario College of Art and began working as an illustrator.

Taxali has lectured at various art schools and belongs to the IPA, (Illustrators’ Partnership of America) and the Stamp Advisory Committee for Canada Post. He has been involved with professional associations including the Juno Awards (Screening Committee), The Society of Illustrators, the National Magazine Awards, the Dallas Society of Visual Communications, and 3×3: The Magazine of Contemporary Illustration.

Technique

Taxali's style is a mixture of vintage comics and advertising, street art and fine art. He highlights consumer insecurities of today's society with a comical twist.

Awards
American Illustration
Communication Arts Illustration Annual 
Society of Illustrators (Gold Medal), Print 
Society of Publication Designers 
National Magazine Awards (Gold Medal) 
Chicago Creative Club 
The Advertising and Design Club of Canada 
National Gold Addy 
Shortlist for a Cannes Lion

References

https://web.archive.org/web/20110719151907/http://www.garytaxali.com/biography.php

Canadian illustrators
Living people
Year of birth missing (living people)